
Gmina Babimost is an urban-rural gmina (administrative district) in Zielona Góra County, Lubusz Voivodeship, in western Poland.

Villages
Apart from the town of Babimost, Gmina Babimost contains the villages and settlements of Janowiec, Kolesin, Kuligowo, Laski, Leśniki, Nowe Kramsko, Podmokle Małe, Podmokle Wielkie, Podzamcze, Stare Kramsko and Zdzisław.

Neighbouring gminas
Gmina Babimost is bordered by the gminas of Kargowa, Siedlec, Sulechów, Szczaniec, Zbąszyń and Zbąszynek.

Twin towns – sister cities

Gmina Babimost is twinned with:
 Amt Döbern-Land, Germany
 Neuruppin, Germany

References

Babimost
Zielona Góra County